Mollerussa is the capital of the comarca of Pla d'Urgell, in the province of Lleida, Catalonia, Spain.
It is 250 metres above sea level. In 2010 it had a population of 14,733.

Demography:

References

Further reading

General history

Thematic

External links

 Official website 
 Government data pages 

Municipalities in Pla d'Urgell
Populated places in Pla d'Urgell